Chapel Hill-Carrboro is a city-sized urban area in Orange County, North Carolina consisting of:
 Carrboro
 Chapel Hill
 University of North Carolina at Chapel Hill

Chapel Hill-Carrboro may also refer to:
 Chapel Hill-Carrboro City Schools, the local school district